Thysanoprymna is a genus of moths in the family Erebidae.

Species

Thysanoprymna cepiana Druce, 1893
Thysanoprymna drucei (Rothschild, 1910)
Thysanoprymna haemorrhoides (Schaus, 1905)
Thysanoprymna hampsoni (Dognin, 1902)
Thysanoprymna morio (Seitz, 1920)
Thysanoprymna palmeri (Rothschild, 1916)
Thysanoprymna pyrrhopyga (Walker, [1865])
Thysanoprymna roseocincta (Seitz, 1920)
Thysanoprymna superba (Schaus, 1889)

References
"Thysanoprymna Butler, 1875" at Markku Savela's Lepidoptera and Some Other Life Forms

Phaegopterina
Moth genera